Colette Paul QPM is a Police Officer of the United Kingdom.  She was the Chief Constable of Bedfordshire Police.

Chief Constable of Bedfordshire

Paul was appointed as Chief Constable of Bedfordshire Police by the regional Police and Crime Commissioner, Olly Martins, in May 2013.  Her predecessor transferred to the Ministry of Defence Police. In June 2015 she announced that she is taking retirement.

References

Living people
British Chief Constables
English recipients of the Queen's Police Medal
Year of birth missing (living people)